Ruslan Karimovich Nigmatullin (born 7 October 1974 in Kazan, Tatar Autonomous Soviet Socialist Republic, Soviet Union) is a retired association footballer of Volga Tatar ethnicity who played goalkeeper and is currently working as a DJ. He has appeared for the Russian national team 24 times (including 5 Olympic appearances) and was their starting keeper at the 2002 World Cup. He was voted Russian Player of the Year 2001 and is considered the best Russian goalkeeper of his period.

Also known as DJ after completing his football career.

Biography

Retirement
Despite officially retiring from football in February 2006, in September 2008, Nigmatullin decided to make a deal with FC SKA Rostov-on-Don, Russian club from First Division. After playing for another year for 3 clubs, he retired again in November 2009.

Time in Israel
Nigmatullin signed with Israeli club, Maccabi Ahi Nazareth for the 2009–10 season. His start was a shaky one but his performance improved over the weeks as he acclimated to Israel. Nevertheless, he requested to leave the club in November 2009.

Honours
 Russian Premier League champion: 1996, 1997, 2004.
 Russian Premier League runner-up: 1999, 2000, 2001, 2002.
 Russian Premier League bronze: 1995, 1998.
 Russian Cup winner: 2000, 2001.
 Russian Cup finalist: 1998.

Career statistics

Footnotes

1974 births
Living people
Russian footballers
FC KAMAZ Naberezhnye Chelny players
FC Lokomotiv Moscow players
FC SKA Rostov-on-Don players
FC Spartak Moscow players
Hellas Verona F.C. players
FC Akhmat Grozny players
FC Anzhi Makhachkala players
Maccabi Ahi Nazareth F.C. players
Association football goalkeepers
Serie A players
Serie B players
Footballers from Kazan
PFC CSKA Moscow players
Russia under-21 international footballers
Russia international footballers
Russian Premier League players
Israeli Premier League players
2002 FIFA World Cup players
Tatar people of Russia
U.S. Salernitana 1919 players
Russian DJs
Russian expatriate footballers
Expatriate footballers in Italy
Expatriate footballers in Israel
Russian expatriate sportspeople in Italy
Russian expatriate sportspeople in Israel
Tatar sportspeople